Helcion concolor, common name the variable limpet, is a species of sea snail, a true limpet, a marine gastropod mollusk in the family Patellidae, one of the families of true limpets.

Distribution
This species occurs in the Indian Ocean off Mozambique and South Africa.

Description
The size of the shell varies between 30 mm and 60 mm.

References

 Kalk, M. (1958). The fauna of the intertidal rocks at Inhaca Island, Delagoa Bay. Ann. Natal Mus. 14: 189–242.
 Kilburn, R. N. 1972. Taxonomic notes on South African marine Mollusca (2), with the description of new species and subspecies of Conus, Nassarius, Vexillum and Demoulia. Annals of the Natal Museum 21(2):391–437, 15 figs.
 Kilburn, R.N. & Rippey, E. (1982) Sea Shells of Southern Africa. Macmillan South Africa, Johannesburg, xi + 249 pp. page(s): 37
 Steyn, D.G. & Lussi, M. (1998) Marine Shells of South Africa. An Illustrated Collector’s Guide to Beached Shells. Ekogilde Publishers, Hartebeespoort, South Africa, ii + 264 pp. page(s): 16
 Koufopanou et al. (1999). A molecular phylogeny of the patellid limpets (Gastropoda: Patellidae) and its implications for the origins of their antitropical distribution Mol. Phylogenet. Evol. 11(1):138–156
  Branch, G.M. et al. (2002). Two Oceans. 5th impression. David Philip, Cate Town & Johannesburg
 Nakano & Ozawa (2007). Worldwide phylogeography of limpets of the order Patellogastropoda: Molecular, morphological and palaeontological evidence. Journal of Molluscan Studies 73(1) 79–99. 
 Petit R.E. (2009) George Brettingham Sowerby, I, II & III: their conchological publications and molluscan taxa. Zootaxa 2189: 1–218

External links
 

Patellidae
Gastropods described in 1848
Taxa named by Christian Ferdinand Friedrich Krauss